Tanghin is a town in the Méguet Department of Ganzourgou Province in central Burkina Faso. The town has a population of 2,902.

References

External links
Satellite map at Maplandia.com

Population of Tanghin : 6542
Distance to the nearest small city of Zorgho : 15 km

Populated places in the Plateau-Central Region
Ganzourgou Province